Genghis Khan is a 1965 adventure film directed by Henry Levin and starring Omar Sharif, depicting a fictionalized account of the life and conquests of the Mongol emperor Genghis Khan. Distributed in the United Kingdom and the United States in 1965 by Columbia Pictures, the film also features James Mason, Stephen Boyd, Eli Wallach, Françoise Dorléac and Telly Savalas.

A 70 mm version was released by CCC Film in West Germany. It was filmed in Yugoslavia with Technicolor and Panavision.

Plot 
The young Temujin (Omar Sharif) sees his father tortured and killed by a rival tribe led by Jamuga (Stephen Boyd).  Held prisoner, he is yoked into a large wooden wheel around his neck and tormented by the tribal children. He meets the young Bortai after an act of kindness to her, but is punished by Jamuga.  Temujin then escapes and hides in the hills, followed by Geen and Sengal, who pledge their allegiance to the man vowing to unite all the Mongol tribes.

Raids along caravan routes gradually increase the size of his army, and then Temujin decides to capture and take as his wife the young Bortai. He does so, but then she is recaptured by Jamuga, who rapes her before Temujin can steal her back.

A stranded Chinese ambassador is helped out by Temujin, who accompanies the diplomat into Song China, where he is proclaimed "Genghis Khan, the Prince of Conquerors".   His Mongol army stays in Peking for a long period, training, learning, and growing complacent. The imprisoned Jamuga escapes at one point. Finally, feeling trapped, the Mongols break out of their "captivity" and begin their conquest of Asia.

After laying waste to everything from Manchuria to Moscow, the Mongol army finally battles the Shah of Khwarezm, defeating him and capturing Jamuga one last time.  Temujin and Jamuga fight one last battle, mano-a-mano, and although victorious, Temujin succumbs to his wounds soon after.

Cast
 Omar Sharif as Temujin, later Genghis Khan
 Stephen Boyd as Jamuga
 James Mason as Kam Ling
 Eli Wallach as Shah of Khwarezm
 Françoise Dorléac as Bortei
 Telly Savalas as Shan
 Robert Morley as Emperor of China
 Michael Hordern as Geen
 Yvonne Mitchell as Katke
 Woody Strode as Sengal
 Kenneth Cope as Subotai
 Roger Croucher as Massar
 Don Borisenko as Jebai
 Patrick Holt as Kuchiuk
  as Chin Yu
 George Savalas as Toktoa
 Gustavo Rojo as Altan

Production
The film was shot over 125 days.

Allen and Euan Lloyd (who worked in publicity) wanted to make a follow up called Clive of India based on a script by Terence Young but it was never made.

Box office
In the United States and Canada, the film earned $2.25 million in distributor rentals.

In Europe, the film sold  tickets in West Germany and 879,532 tickets in France, for a combined  tickets sold in West Germany and France.

See also
 List of Asian historical drama films

References

External links
 
 
 
 

1965 films
1960s historical adventure films
1960s biographical films
British historical adventure films
British biographical films
British epic films
British adventure drama films
English-language Yugoslav films
Films directed by Henry Levin
Films with screenplays by Berkely Mather
Columbia Pictures films
Depictions of Genghis Khan on film
Films set in the 12th century
Films set in the 13th century
Films set in the Mongol Empire
Films set in Mongolia
Yugoslav historical adventure films
Films shot in Yugoslavia
Films with screenplays by Beverley Cross
Films set in Iran
Films set in Beijing
Films set in the Song dynasty
1960s English-language films
1960s British films